Sirud (also Romanized as Sīrūd and Sehrūd) is a village in Chendar Rural District, Chendar District, Savojbolagh County, Alborz Province, Iran. At the 2006 census, its population was 95, in 42 families.

References 

Populated places in Savojbolagh County